Julia Voth (born May 16, 1985) is a Canadian actress and model. She is best known for her roles in the 2009 film Bitch Slap and the TV-series Package Deal, as well as for being the character model for Jill Valentine for a number of the Resident Evil video games.

Career

Modeling

Voth's modeling career has included photo shoots and commercials for brands such as Guess, Calvin Klein and Shiseido. She served as the character model for Jill Valentine of the 2002 Resident Evil video game. Her likeness was also used in several other video games in the Resident Evil franchise. After receiving a custom-made Resident Evil beret from a fan, Voth was inspired to do a photoshoot cosplaying as Valentine.

Acting
Voth starred alongside America Olivo and Erin Cummings in the action film Bitch Slap, playing the down-on-her-luck stripper named Trixie. She has also appeared on episodes of the TV series' Castle, Supernatural and Huge. Voth had a main role in the comedy sitcom Package Deal, which ran for two seasons from 2013 to 2014.

Personal life
Voth is married to talent-manager/film-producer David Zonshine. They have one child, a daughter, born in 2020.

Filmography

Film

Television

References

External links

 
 

21st-century Canadian actresses
American female models
American film actresses
Canadian emigrants to the United States
Canadian female models
Canadian film actresses
Cosplayers
Living people
Actresses from Regina, Saskatchewan
1985 births
21st-century American women